Isabella Eugénie Boyer (17 December 1841 – 12 May 1904) was a French-American model and heiress.

Biography
She was born in Paris to Louis Noël Boyer, an Africa-born French confectioner, and his English-born wife Pamela Lockwood (aka Pamilla). She married Isaac Merritt Singer, the founder of the Singer Sewing Machine Co., in New York City, in 1863 when Isaac was 52 and Isabella was only 22. Singer had a previous common-law wife, Mary Ann Sponsler, who had Isaac arrested for bigamy.

Isabella and Isaac moved to Paris, then to Oldway Mansion in Paignton, on the Devon coast, because New York society frowned on his many "families." They had six children; Sir Adam Mortimer Singer (1863—1929), Winnaretta Eugénie Singer (1865–1943), Washington Merritt Grant Singer (1866–1934), Paris Eugene Singer (1867–1932), Isabelle-Blanche Singer (1869–1896) and Franklin Merritt Morse Singer (1870–1939).

Isaac Singer is reported to have had a total of 22 children with his many paramours. Singer died in 1875 and left an estate of about $14 million, which at the time was a colossal sum of money. His two wills created family tension and lawsuits. Isabella was declared his legal widow.

On 8 January 1879, Isabella married a Dutch musician, and settled in Paris. Victor was an internationally successful singer and violinist. He was born in 1843 in Sittard, as Nicolas Reubsaet, a son of a simple shoemaker. Pretending to be of noble descent, he falsely claimed the title Vicomte d’Estenburgh. In 1881, he did obtain the title of Duke of Camposelice from Italian King Umberto I, in appreciation for a generous act of philanthropy in favor of the Italian colonies.

The Duchess of Camposelice was still a striking lady when she met the sculptor Bartholdi. It is rumoured she was his model for the Statue of Liberty, however this claim may not be correct.

Victor Reubsaet died in September 1887 and Isabella was married, for the third time, in December 1891, to the art collector Paul Sohège.

Isabella Eugenia Boyer died at 62 years of age in 1904 in Paris.

References

External links
 The story of Isaac and Isabella at Caught in the Web – Bytes of Torbay's Past

1841 births
1904 deaths
Models from Paris
French artists' models
Italian duchesses